What Will Happen to Us is a 2004  Italian romantic comedy film directed by Giovanni Veronesi.

Plot 
In Rome three friends end to give the exams in last year of grammar high school, and grant a lovely summer holiday in Greece, on the island of Santorini. Matteo is a young problematic and indifferent, which is hoping for a ransom of his controversial personality through love. Manuel is a gruff guy who hates his late father, and hopes for a better future for himself, because he does not want to work at the pet store with her mother. Paolo is the more shy of the group, who is in search of himself and of love. In Greece the three know beautiful girls, however also suffer betrayals of love. At the end of the story, only Manuel discovers himself, becoming more loving and positive towards life.

Cast 

Silvio Muccino: Matteo
Violante Placido: Carmen
Giuseppe Sanfelice: Paolo
Elio Germano: Manuel
Valeria Solarino: Bea
Enrico Silvestrin: Sandro
Katy Louise Saunders: Valentina
Myriam Catania: Monica
Pino Quartullo: Father of Paolo
Rocco Papaleo: Doorman
Paola Tiziana Cruciani: Mother of Manuel

See also  
 List of Italian films of 2004

References

External links

2004 films
Italian romantic comedy films
2004 romantic comedy films
Films directed by Giovanni Veronesi
Films shot in Santorini
2000s Italian films